The Central District of Ardabil County is in Ardabil County, Ardabil province, Iran. At the 2006 census, its population was 502,186 in 123,050 households. The following census in 2011 counted 533,495 people in 148,318 households. At the latest census in 2016, the district had 578,237 inhabitants living in 172,862 households.

References 

Ardabil County

Districts of Ardabil Province

Populated places in Ardabil Province

Populated places in Ardabil County